Gender essentialism is a theory that is used to examine the attribution of distinct, fixed, intrinsic qualities to women and men. In this theory, based in essentialism, there are certain universal, innate, biologically or psychologically based features of gender that are at the root of observed differences in the behavior of men and women. In Western civilization, it is suggested in writings going back to ancient Greece. With the advent of Christianity, the earlier Greek model was expressed in theological discussions as the doctrine that there are two distinct sexes, male and female created by God, and that individuals are immutably one or the other. This view remained essentially unchanged until the middle of the 19th century. This changed the locus of the origin of the essential differences from religion to biology, in Sandra Bem's words, "from God's grand creation [to] its scientific equivalent: evolution's grand creation," but the belief in an immutable origin had not changed.

Alternatives to gender essentialism were proposed in the mid-20th century. During second-wave feminism, Simone de Beauvoir and other feminists in the 1960s and 70s theorized that gender differences were socially constructed. In other words, people gradually conform to gender differences through their experience of the social world. More recently, Judith Butler theorized that people construct gender by performing it. While still strongly criticized by many feminist theorists, gender essentialism sheds light on social constructs surrounding gender that are found in society as well as societal views on sex and sexuality.

Claims

Biology 
The gender essentialist claim of biology theorizes that gender differences are rooted in nature and biology. Historical views based in gender essentialism claim that there are biological causes for the differences between men and women, such as women giving birth and men going out and hunting. This claim is analyzed in detail by Emily Martin in her article Medical Metaphors of Women’s Bodies: Menstruation and Menopause. In her article, Martin examines some of the historical views that used biology to explain the differences between women and men. One popular view in ancient Greece was that men were superior to women because they could sweat out their toxins while women had to menstruate to get rid of their toxins.

In 1975, American biologist, Edward O. Wilson, claimed that “both human and social behavior and human organization” are encoded in human genes. He later added to this claim, using the example of reproduction and how one male can fertilize many females but a female can be fertilized by only one male.”

Masculinity 
The gender essentialist claim of masculinity theorizes that men are dominant, and women are submissive. It is influenced by socially constructed gender roles and traditional, patriarchal views about how men and women should act. Feminist theorist, Sandra Bem, analyzes the claim and its roots in her 1993 book, The Lenses of Gender: Transforming the Debate on Sexual Inequality. Bem also breaks down how gender differences are perceived in society and how patriarchal views and claims of biology work together to “reproduce male power.”

Normal gender 
The gender essentialist theory of normal gender is rooted in the idea that there are only two genders – male and female. This claim is analyzed by feminist theorist Monique Witting in her article, One Is Not Born A Woman. In her piece, Witting’s main claim counters the theory of gender essentialism, claiming that there is not a “natural” group of women and this idea is founded in patriarchal oppression, sexism, and homophobia.

In feminism 
In feminist theory and gender studies, gender essentialism is the attribution of a fixed essence to women. Women's essence is assumed to be universal and is generally identified with those characteristics viewed as being specifically feminine. These ideas of femininity are usually related to biology and often concern psychological characteristics such as nurturance, empathy, support, non-competitiveness, etc.

Feminist theory 
In 1980, feminist theorist Monique Witting published One Is Not Born A Woman, an article that discusses how gender essentialist views regarding men, women, and gender roles work to re-establish patriarchal roles and ideas in society. She also talks about how these views contribute to women’s oppression, focusing on “lesbianism” and how it goes against the “rules” that society has set in place. Witting’s piece shows how the gender essentialist claim of normal gender is rooted in homophobia and how these roots continue to allow women to be oppressed.

In 1988, feminist theorist Emily Martin published Medical Metaphors of Women’s Bodies: Menstruation and Menopause. This piece analyzed the history of gender essentialist claims and how biology has been used to explain differences between genders. This claim of biology, according to Martin, dates back to ancient Greece  Martin explains that, throughout history, views regarding women varied with menstruation originally being viewed as something important but still something that made women lesser, but later changing to be viewed as a disorder that negatively impacted women’s lives. Martin’s piece provides insight on how society places great importance on the different biological processes between genders.

The 1993 publication of The Lenses of Gender by feminist theorist Sandra Bem addresses how gender differences are perceived by society. She also talks about how essentialist gender roles reproduce male power.

Feminist theorist Elizabeth Grosz states in her 1995 publication, Space, Time and Perversion: Essays on the Politics of Bodies, that essentialism "entails the belief that those characteristics defined as women's essence are shared in common by all women at all times. It implies a limit of the variations and possibilities of change—it is not possible for a subject to act in a manner contrary to her essence. Her essence underlies all the apparent variations differentiating women from each other. Essentialism thus refers to the existence of fixed characteristic, given attributes, and ahistorical functions that limit the possibilities of change and thus of social reorganization."(1995:47)

In biology

Biologism
Biologism is a particular form of essentialism that defines women's and men's essence in terms of biological capacities. This form of essentialism is based on a form of reductionism, meaning that social and cultural factors are the effects of biological causes. Biological reductivism "claim[s] that anatomical and physiological differences—especially reproductive differences—characteristic of human males and females determine both the meaning of masculinity and femininity and the appropriately different positions of men and women in society". Biologism uses the functions of reproduction, nurturance, neurology, neurophysiology, and endocrinology to limit women's social and psychological possibilities according to biologically established limits. It asserts the science of biology to constitute an unalterable definition of identity, which inevitably "amounts to a permanent form of social containment for women". Naturalism is also a part of the system of essentialism where a fixed nature is postulated for women through the means of theological or ontological rather than biological grounds. An example of this would be the claim that women's nature is a God-given attribute, or the ontological invariants in Sartrean existentialism or Freudian psychoanalysis that distinguish the sexes in the "claim that the human subject is somehow free or that the subjects social position is a function of his or her genital morphology". These systems are used to homogenize women into one singular category and to strengthen a binary between men and women.

Superior gender 
Throughout history women have been viewed as the submissive and inferior gender. In ancient Greece, this view was supported by the belief that women had to rid their bodies of toxins by menstruating while men could sweat their toxins out. By the 1800s, this view remained the same, but the reasoning had changed. In 1879, the French doctor, Gustave Le Bon, explained this inferiority of women as their brains being closer to the size of gorillas than most male brains. Le Bon also stated that women were fickle, inconsistent, lacked thought and logic, and were not able to reason.

Child development 
Children have been observed making gender categorizations and displaying essentialist beliefs about gender preferences and indications. Proponents of gender essentialism propose that children from the age of 4 to 10 show the tendency to endorse the role of nature in determining gender-stereotyped properties, an "early bias to view gender categories as predictive of essential, underlying similarities", which gradually declines as they pass elementary school years.

In religion 

The male–female dichotomy has been an important factor in most religions. In the Abrahamic religions the difference between man and woman is established at the origin of time, with the bible saying of Adam and Eve "...in the image of God he created them; male and female he created them", indicating that the difference is instituted by God. Some discuss if this verse is a expression of gender essentialism or a reference to humanity as a whole.

In Norse mythology Ask and Embla were the first people, man and woman, created by the gods. Other Nordic myths have LGBT themes.

Religion and biology 
Gender essentialism has been heavily influenced by both religion and by science, with religion being the prominent reasoning behind gender essentialism until the mid-1800s. The reasoning ultimately changed from religion to science, but still supported the same essentialist thinking.

Latter-day Saints 

The official view of the Church of Jesus Christ of Latter-day Saints (LDS Church) is an essentialist belief in gender. The 1995 LDS Church statement The Family: A Proclamation to the World declares gender to be an "essential characteristic" and an "eternal identity". Mormons generally believe in an eternal life and that it would be impossible for one's eternal gender to be different from one's physical, birth sex. Church regulations permit, but do not mandate, ex-communication for those who choose sexual reassignment surgery, and deny them membership in the priesthood.

Criticism and movements

Social construction of gender 

The main alternative to gender essentialism is the theory of the social construction of gender. In contrast to gender essentialism, social constructionism views gender as created and influenced by society and culture, both of which differ according to time and place. Theories of the social construction of gender grew out of theories in second-wave feminism in the latter half of the 20th century.

Women's suffrage movement 
Prior to the 1960s, dating back to the second half of the 1800s, feminists were beginning to actively identify and challenge “legal and social inequalities between the sexes."

Feminist activists, Elizabeth Cady Stanton and Lucretia Mott were among some of the first to take a public stand against gender essentialist views that led to sexism. In 1848, Stanton and Mott held the first women’s rights conference. Then, in 1869. Stanton and Susan B. Anthony founded the National Women’s Suffrage Association.

Second-wave feminism 
The start of second-wave feminism in the 1960s pushed for serious change in how society reacted towards sexism and gender essentialist views. Although it brought to attention gender segregation in the workplace and the gender pay gap, little has changed in the power dynamic as it is so deeply ingrained into society.

Alternative theories of gender

Gender performativity 

Judith Butler's theory of gender performativity can be seen as a means to show "the ways in which reified and naturalized conceptions of gender might be understood as constituted and, hence, capable of being constituted differently". Butler uses the phenomenological theory of acts espoused by Edmund Husserl, Maurice Merleau-Ponty and George Herbert Mead, which seeks to explain the mundane way in which "social agents constitute social reality through language, gesture, and all manner of symbolic social sign", to create her conception of gender performativity. She begins by quoting Simone de Beauvoir's claim: "One is not born, but rather becomes, a woman."This statement distinguishes sex from gender suggesting that gender is an aspect of identity that is gradually acquired. This distinction between sex, as the anatomical aspects of the female body, and gender, as the cultural meaning that forms the body and the various modes of bodily articulation, means that it is "no longer possible to attribute the values or social functions of women to biological necessity". Butler interprets this claim as an appropriation of the doctrine of constituting acts from the tradition of phenomenology. Butler concludes that "gender is in no way a stable identity or locus of agency from which various acts proceed; rather, it is an identity tenuously constituted in time—an identity instituted through the stylization of the body and, hence, must be understood as the mundane way in which bodily gestures, movements and enactments of various kinds constitute the illusion of an abiding gendered self".

Candace West and Sarah Fenstermaker also conceptualize gender "as a routine, methodical, and ongoing accomplishment, which involves a complex of perceptual, interactional and micropolitical activities that cast particular pursuits as expressions of manly and womanly 'natures'" in their 1995 text Doing Difference.

This does not mean that the material nature of the human body is denied, instead, it is re-comprehended as separate from the process by which "the body comes to bear cultural meanings". Therefore, the essence of gender is not natural because gender itself is not a natural fact but the outcome of the sedimentation of specific corporeal acts that have been inscribed through repetition and rearticulation over time onto the body. "If the reality of gender is constituted by the performance itself, then there is no recourse to an essential and unrealized 'sex' or 'gender' which gender performances ostensibly express".

Intersectionality 

Analyzing gender has been a concern of feminist theory. There have been many modes of understanding how gender addresses meaning, but developing such theories of gender can obscure the significance of other aspects of women's identities, such as race, class, and sexual orientation, which marginalizes the experiences and voices of women of colour, non-Western women, working-class women, lesbian/bisexual women, and trans women. As a challenge to feminist theory, essentialism refers to the problem of theorizing gender as both an identity and a mark of difference. This refers to a problem for the concept of subjectivity presupposed by feminist theories of gender. There are arguments, made primarily by black and lesbian feminists, that feminist theory has capitalized on the idea of gender essentialism by using the category of gender to appeal to "women's experience" as a whole. By doing this, feminist theory makes universalizing and normalizing claims for and about women, which are only true of white, Western, heterosexual, cisgender, middle- or upper-class women, but which it implies are situations, perspectives and experiences true of all women. Patrice DiQuinzio discusses "how critics of exclusion see this as a function of feminist theory's commitment to theorizing gender exclusively and articulating women's experiences in terms of gender alone". Instead one must theorize feminism in a way that takes the interlocking category of experiences between race, class, gender, and sexuality into consideration; an intersectional model of thinking.

Mothering 
Some feminists, such as DiQuinzio and Nancy Chodorow, have used the idea of a woman's essence to link gender socialization with exclusively female mothering. Butler disagreed, because not all women are mothers, due to age or personal choice, and even some mothers do not regard motherhood as the most important aspect of political struggle.

Transfeminism 

Essentialism of gender in feminist theory presents a problem regarding transfeminism. Gayle Salamon writes about trans studies that they are to be "the breaking apart of this category, particularly if that breaking requires a new articulation of the relation between sex and gender, male and female". Transubjectivity challenges the binary of gender essentialism as it disrupts the "fixed taxonomies of gender" and this creates a resistance in women's studies, which as a discipline has historically depended upon the fixedness of gender. Trans identities break down the very possibility of gender essentialism by queering the binary of gender, gender roles and expectations. In recent years, through the work of transfeminists such as Sandy Stone, the theory of trans women and their inclusion into feminist spaces has opened, just as theories of race, class, sexuality and ability did.

Post-structuralism 

Poststructuralism indicates "a field of critical practices that cannot be totalized and that, therefore, interrogate the formative and exclusionary power of sexual difference", says Butler. Therefore, through the poststructuralist lens, the critique of gender essentialism is possible because poststructuralist theory generates analyses, critiques, and political interventions, and opens up a political imaginary for feminism that is otherwise constrained. Feminist poststructuralism does not designate a position from which one operates, but offers a set of tools and terms to be "reused and rethought, exposed as strategic instruments and effects, and subjected to a critical reinscription and redeployment". Critics such as Susan Bordo suggest that Butler is reducing gender to language and abstraction.

See also 
 Empathizing–systemizing theory
 Essentialism
 French post-structuralist feminism
 Gendered sexuality
 Neuroscience of sex differences
 Neuroplasticity
 The NeuroGenderings Network

References

Further reading 
 

Feminist terminology
Feminist theory
Social constructionism
Essentialism